Loomer is a surname. Notable people with the surname include:

People
 Bernard Loomer (1912–1985), American theologian
 Laura Loomer (born 1993), American political activist, conspiracy theorist, and Internet personality
 Lisa Loomer (born 1950), American playwright and screenwriter
 Lorne Loomer (1937–2017), Canadian rower

Other
 Camp Loomer; see San Francisco Bay Area Council
 George W. Loomer House, Detroit, Michigan
 "Loomer", song on the My Bloody Valentine album Loveless
 Loomer (band), band from Ontario, Canada
 Loomer Road Stadium, Chesterton, Staffordshire